Cláudia Monteiro (born 8 May 1961) is a Brazilian former professional tennis player.

Monteiro played in the mixed doubles final of the French Open with Cássio Motta in 1982. She holds a career singles record of 41 wins and 82 defeats, and a doubles record of 112 wins and 131 defeats  After retiring in 1987, at the age of 26, she moved to Santa Fe, New Mexico, acting as a past life therapist and then a tennis coach.

Grand Slam finals

Mixed Doubles (1 runner-up)

References

External links
 
 
 

1961 births
Living people
Brazilian female tennis players
21st-century Brazilian women
20th-century Brazilian women